Khabardar (Urdu:خبردار) was an Urdu and Punjabi comedy television show created and hosted by Aftab Iqbal, and broadcast on Express News. The first season of the show had its premiere on 10 September 2015, aired at 11:03 pm on Thursdays, Fridays, Saturdays and Sundays on Express News from 2015 to 2018. Khabardar returned for its second season on 21 January 2021.

History
Iqbal quit from GEO show Khabarnaak which he had started in 2010 and started hosting Khabardaar on Express News in August 2015. He was joined by fellow stars  Agha Majid, Rubi Anam and Honey Albela on the show. In addition, Nasir Chinioti was made part of the cast. Majid left the show in December 2016.

Iqbal and the cast left the show in April 2018 to start Khabarzar on Aap News.

Iqbal and his team once again joined Express News in January 2021 for the second season.

Premise
The series revolves around Aftab Iqbal and his team of comedians, including Honey Albela, Babbu Rana, Asad Kaifi, Mubeen Gabol and Azhar Rangeela, who play various characters. Each episode unfolds in three parts with the first part being a comic skit. The second and third parts involve the comedians commenting on current events.

Cast

Season 1

Main
 Aftab Iqbal (Host)

 Honey Albela as himself / Sikander Unani / Teddy
 Nasir Chinyoti as himself / Hanif "Teera" / Chowdhury / Gabbar Singh / The Godfather
 Saleem Albela as himself and various characters
 Agha Majid as Aaroo Grenade / SHO
 Rubi Anam as Sadak and various characters
 Babbu Rana (Babar Fateh Ali Khan) as himself and various characters
 Naseer Bhai as himself
 Eshal Ali (Co-Host)
 Abubakar Khan as Nidhal (Researcher)

Recurring
 Naseem Vicky as himself and various characters
 Sardar Kamal as himself and various characters
 Ayub Mirza as himself / Sheetal
 Lucky Dear as himself and various characters
 Azhar Rangeela as himself / Aslam Sukhera / Bittu Bhai
 Asad Kaifi as himself / Jago / Man Singh
 Maira Khan as herself / Baano / Farhi / Heer / Mehru / Maryam Nawaz'mimic / Raadha
 Mubeen Gabol as Shahrukh Khan's mimic
 Abdul Rehman Amjad (Researcher)
 Mariyam Ali Hussain (Co-Host)

Season 2

Main
 Aftab Iqbal (Host)
 Babbu Rana (Babar Fateh Ali Khan) as himself / Pathanay Khan / Rana Jamil Zaidi / Shahid Khaqan Abbasi's mimic / Narendra Modi's mimic / Shakur (Usman Buzdar's advisor) / Meghan Markle's mimic / Veeru / TRY / Kambdi (Bollywood actor)
 Azhar Rangeela as himself / Aslam Sukhera / Bittu Bhai / Bhai  (Anjaanay Khan's brother)
 Asad Kaifi as himself / Jago / Man Singh / Sippy
 Mubeen Gabol as Rana Sanaullah's mimic / Shahrukh Khan's mimic / Yousaf Raza Gillani's mimic / Arnab Goswami's mimic / Shehbaz Sharif's mimic / Sherry Rehman's mimic / Begada / Asif Ali Zardari's mimic / Kamran Khan's mimic / Usman Buzdar's mimic / Queen Elizabeth's mimic / Matkoo
 Maira Khan as herself / Baano / Farhi / Heer / Mehru / Maryam Nawaz'mimic / Sehar / Raadha
 Soniya Multani as herself / Basanti and various characters
 Ukasha Gul as herself / Mughniyeh / Shammo / (Temporary Co-Host)
 Javed Islam as himself
 Peeran Ditta as Nagi
 Dr Arooba Tariq (Co-Host) / (Temporary Host)

Recurring
 Waseem Punu as himself / Ambar / Prince Harry's mimic
 Waheed Khan as Amir Khan's mimic / Hassan Nisar's mimic / Lala Afghani / Sahir Lodhi's mimic / Birbal / Nawazuddin Siddiqui's mimic / Rashid Latif's mimic
 Saqi Khan as himself and various characters
 Zafri Khan as himself / Jugnu / Thakur / Altan
 Nasir Chinyoti as himself / Chowdhury / Gabbar Singh / The Godfather / Hanif "Teera" / Hanif "Phudak" Tadap
 Nayab Faiza as herself / Raadha and various characters

Special episodes
 Women Day Special - The episode was aired on 8 March 2021, On the occasion of International Women's Day, Dr. Arooba Tariq hosted the show and special guests appeared including Faisal Sherjan, Javeria Khan, Hina Niazi and Armala Hassan. The show's regular Maira Khan and Ukasha Gul also shared their thoughts on the issue.

Notable segments

Every episode of the show consists of a combination of a subset of the following segments.

Subject of Discussion
The first and main segment is that in which the anchor person, Mr. Aftab Iqbal, presents a topic of discussion for the show. The actors-comedians either as present themselves as parody-guests or perform a short skit. Sometimes, the guests also include famous personalities, such as, politicians, players and actors.

Songs
Another segment is that in which an old song is re-performed by singers and musicians present in the show. Some of the singers that have performed on the show are:

 Mughira Ahmad
 Saira Tahir
 Vicky
 Zain
 Bilal Ahmed Mir
 Saima Mumtaz
 Babbu Rana
 Ukasha Gul
 Saqi Khan
 Khalid Baig
 Nish

Mini Theatre
In this segment, some of the comedians of the show present a short skit. These skits often revolve around the common social evils prevalent in the society. Most famous skits are:
 Khan Brothers: This segment is performed by Honey Albela, Azhar Rangeela and Babbu Rana. These comedians perform as parody singers for various legendary artists from past Including Mehdi Hassan and Pathanay Khan.
 Mosiqar Gharana: The segment opens up in the musicians' house. A Khan Saheb (Babbu Rana) performs the lead vocals of a song. The house is always filled with oddball characters.
 Darbar-e-Sikanadri: A parody version of Alexander the Great (played by Honey Albela) appears in this segment in which he is shown arguing with Aftab Iqbal and other characters present in his court.
 Parlimani Tea Stall: This segment depicts various characters from different levels of society get together to catch up on the latest gossip and news. Tea stall owner is played by Babbu Rana.
 Thana Culture: This skit pokes fun at police department's methods. The convicts try to talk them into accepting the bribe.
 Mughlia Darbar: This segment starts in Mughal court. The characters of Akbar and Nawaz Sharif are merged into one character.

Film Kitab Aur Log
Another segment is named "Movies, Books and People". In this segment, they present information about some famous movies of the past, the books on the base of which those movies were made and the actors, directors, producers and writers of those movies. Some of the films or books that have been parodied on the show are:

 Spider-Man
 Superman
 The Matrix
 The Terminator
 The Godfather
 Valkyrie
 Bedazzled
 The Mummy
 Titanic
 Maula Jatt
 Sholay
 Gone with the Wind

Farhang-e-Asfia
In this segment the host, Aftab Iqbal, presents etymology of a couple of words of Urdu, that evolved radically either due to a mistake of an author or mistake of publisher or due to mishearing of listener.

Ibn-e-Batuta
In this segment the host, Aftab Iqbal discusses famous places of world, that include famous cities, rivers, countries etc.

Naseer Bhai's Challenge
There was a segment in which the audience used to challenge a person named Naseer Bhai by singing a part of a famous song. But it is no more part of the show after Naseer Bhai's sudden death in June 2016. In that segment, Naseer Bhai had to tell the name of singer of that song, the movie from which it was picked and the name of the music composer of that movie. If Naseer Bhai was unable to recognize the song correctly, then the challenger wins and was presented with a prize. The song could be challenged by both the audience that was present in the studio as well as through telephone. To win the challenge the following conditions must hold:
 The song should be from an Indian or a Pakistani movie released between 1950 and 1980.
 The song should be so well known that at least one person in the audience present in the studio, acknowledges to have heard it before.

Throughout the show, the comedians keep interrupting with funny or satirical one-liners.

Canada tour
In November 2016 the Khabardar team toured Canada, which was very much appreciated by Pakistani and Indian communities. They went on to do many indoor shows organised by Pakistani communities during their stays in different cities of Canada. They have also performed different outdoor skits while visiting famous places like parks, historical buildings, and lakes. All those indoor and outdoor skits throughout their tour across the country are recorded and arranged into a "Travelogue" package to be shown to their audience around the world. The first episode was released on air on 21 January 2017 and it is being shown frequently in an episode every week called "Khabardar Canada Special".

References

External links
 Khabardaar official
 Khabardaar show on YouTube

2015 Pakistani television series debuts
Pakistani comedy television series
Punjabi-language television shows
Urdu-language television shows